Humsafar refers to:

Arts and media
 Hamsafar (film), a 1975 Iranian dramatic-romance film
 Humsafar (album), a 2008 album by KK
 Humsafar (novel), a 2008 Urdu novel by Farhat Ishtiaq
 Humsafar, a 2011-12 Pakistani soap opera based on the novel by Farhat Ishtiaq
Humsafars, a 2014-2015 Indian television drama.

Other
 Humsafar Trust, an NGO based in Mumbai, India
 Humsafar is the in-flight magazine of Pakistan International Airlines
 Humsafar Express, a 3-tier sleeper long-distance premium train operated by Indian Railways